Westisle Composite High School is a Canadian secondary school in, Rosebank, Prince County, Prince Edward Island.

Established in 1979, Westisle provides education for 10th to 12th grade students in the western part of the county.  The school is administratively part of the Public Schools Branch, and  has an estimated student population of approximately 600. Westisle receives its students from two separate intermediate schools, Merritt E. Callaghan Intermediate School and Hernewood Intermediate School.

History

Planning 
In the late 1960s, the Government of Prince Edward Island embarked upon a joint project with the federal government known as the PEI Economic and Social Development Plan. One phase of the plan focused on education and called for a reorganization of the system. The first step was the establishment of five planning boards of 15 members each. After several meetings, the planning board reached the decision to reorganize the school system of western Prince County into six elementary schools, two junior high schools, and a senior high school.

In 1976, construction of Westisle Composite High School began, at the expense of discontinuing more localized secondary education that was taking place at Tignish High, Alberton High and O'Leary High schools. The decision was made to merge all of these former schools into one by then Minister of Education, Bennett Campbell. Though some were against the initial change, many now feel it was an appropriate move.

Opening of the school 
The official opening of the school was held on November 2, 1979. The first principal was Frank Mugglestone. The vice-principals were Lorne MacDougald and Richard Roberts (the school continues to employ two vice principals). There was a teaching staff of forty-two, two secretaries, and a custodial staff of nine members. The school's namesake "Westisle" is derived from the school being located in the westernmost portion of Prince Edward Island.

Holland College 
In the beginning, Holland College began to use the school to offer programs such as electronics, cosmetology, office studies, and a "Leadership Institute" to its students in the western part of Prince County.  The courses at Westisle were offered on an extension basis using personnel and resources from the college's Summerside-area campuses. Night classes began in January 1980 and continued until 1997 when the college ceased use of the school, requiring community college students from the area to commute to campuses in Charlottetown or Summerside. Students can now attend Holland College in the new West Prince Campus located in Alberton.

Notable graduates 
 Morgan Ellis, Hockey Player

Notable staff 

 Dave Cameron - former Ottawa Senators head coach was a guidance counselor at Westisle

See also
List of schools in Prince Edward Island
List of school districts in Prince Edward Island

References

External links
Education of Prince Edward Island website
Western School Board website

High schools in Prince Edward Island
Schools in Prince County, Prince Edward Island
Educational institutions established in 1979
1979 establishments in Prince Edward Island